Pine Ridge is the name of several places in the U.S. state of Florida:
Pine Ridge, Citrus County, Florida
Pine Ridge, Collier County, Florida

nl:Pine Ridge (Florida)